Chalti Ka Naam Gaadi...Let's Go (English: That which moves is a car...Let's Go) is an Indian television sitcom series, which premiered on 28 October 2015 to 16 February 2016, and was broadcast on SAB TV. The series was produced by Deepti Bhatnagar Productions of Deepti Bhatnagar.

Srishty Rode has been finalised to play the female lead role in the series.

Plot
The story of the series is about the Ahuja family living in New Delhi. The life of the family takes an interesting U-turn when they buy their first family car Maruti Alto 800. 
The family's new daughter-in-law, Piya, who is married to Karan, the family's son, tries to impress her in-laws and her sister-in-law, Preeti and her husband, Prem and Karan with her own recipes. While Karan and his Alto faces many problems created daily by his family, friends or even a stranger.

Cast
Srishty Rode as Piya Karan Ahuja
Romit Raj as Karan Ahuja, Piya's Husband
Anang Desai as Anil Ahuja, Karan's Father
Yamini Singh as Aaradhna Anil Ahuja, Karan's Mother
Harsh Khurana as Prem Chopra, Preeti's Husband
Jayshree Soni as Preeti Prem Chopra, Karan's Sister
Amit Behl as Karan's Boss
Darshankumar Rawal as Karan's Friend
 Poorti Arya in Episode 69

External links
Official website
SonyLIV.Com Site

References

Hindi comedy shows
2015 Indian television series debuts
Hindi-language television shows
Indian comedy television series
Indian television sitcoms
Sony SAB original programming
Television shows set in Delhi